Benito Juárez Airport is a public use airport located near Benito Juárez, Buenos Aires, Argentina.

See also
List of airports in Argentina

References

External links 
 Airport record for Benito Juárez Airport at Landings.com

Airports in Buenos Aires Province